The Violin Sonata in B minor, P 110, is a sonata for violin and piano by Italian composer Ottorino Respighi, completed in 1917. It is one of Respighi's major large-scale chamber works.

Background 

Respighi's Violin Sonata was composed in 1917 and is contemporary with one of his major works, Fontane di Roma. It was premiered in Naples on January 20, 1918, by the violinist Arrigo Serato and the pianist Alessandro Longo. In the same year on March 3, the piece was performed again with Respighi's old teacher Federico Sarti with the violin and Respighi himself at the piano. After its initial publication, the sonata gained international notoriety.

Structure 

The sonata is divided into three movements and has a duration of around 25 minutes. The movements are untitled, except for the third movement, which is a set of 20 variations on an ostinato-like accompaniment. The movement list is as follows: 

The sonata is known for its demanding violin and piano parts and its complex tonal system. Rhythm patterns are also very complex, as time signatures do not always match.

References

Further reading 

Compositions by Ottorino Respighi
1917 compositions
Respighi
Music with dedications